Gale Lillian Fitzgerald (born June 9, 1951, Newark, New Jersey) is a former American athlete who competed in two Olympic pentathlons, winning silver medal in 1975 at the Pan American Games. In 1970, she was AIAW champion in the 440 yards. She ran on four world-record setting 4×440 yard relay teams in 1970-71. Fitzgerald attended Montclair State University where she earned a master's degree. During this time, she trained for the 1976 Summer Olympics.

Fitzgerald was a resident of East Orange, New Jersey.

After retiring from athletics, she sold life insurance before becoming an investment banker before investing in her own companies. Working for Film Star Releasing, she formed Global Media, attracting over $500 million in pre-paid advertising credits. Fitzgerald was also movie producer and served as President of Sunset Hill Productions.

Personal bests

 100y – 11.1 (1968)
 200 – 24.0 (1972)
 400 – 54.4 (1968)
 800 – 2:12.1 (1971)
 100H – 13.9 (1976)
 400H – 1:01.01 (1973)
 HJ – 5-8¼i [1.73] (1975)
 LJ – 20-2¾ [6.16] (1976)
 SP – 44-10¼ [13.67] (1975)
 Pen – 4566 (1975)

References

1951 births
Living people
Sportspeople from East Orange, New Jersey
Track and field athletes from Newark, New Jersey
American female sprinters
American pentathletes
Olympic track and field athletes of the United States
Olympic female pentathletes
Athletes (track and field) at the 1976 Summer Olympics
Athletes (track and field) at the 1972 Summer Olympics
Montclair State University alumni
Athletes (track and field) at the 1975 Pan American Games
Pan American Games silver medalists for the United States
Pan American Games medalists in athletics (track and field)
Medalists at the 1975 Pan American Games
21st-century American women